4 Only is the third Korean-language and fourth overall studio album by South Korean singer Lee Hi, released on September 9, 2021, through AOMG. It is Lee's first studio album since Seoulite (2016), and first collection of new material since her 2019 EP 24°C and subsequent departure from YG Entertainment.

The single "Red Lipstick" featuring Yoon Mi-rae was released alongside the album on September 9. The album debuted at number 18 on the Gaon Album Chart in October 2021 following its physical release, selling over 8,000 copies in the last week of September.

Music and lyrics
According to the description of the album, the protagonist of 4 Only encounters different types of love in each track. The emotions frequently change within each track, expressing such things as the purity of love, sorrow, joy, sadness, thrill, anger, regret, excitement, and desperation.

To embody the theme of expressing the various emotions of love, Lee Hi incorporates various music genres on the album, setting her voice against synth-pop and jazz melodies rather than the funky R&B soul of her previous songs. The Latin-style song "Intentions" emphasizes her husky voice while "Waterride" adds a rhythmic guitar performance in a fast tempo. "Savior", the third collaboration between Lee Hi and B.I, includes jazz sounds and poetic lyrics. "Red Lipstick" is a retro-style song that "drew inspiration from the South Korean R&B and hip-hop duo Tashannie."

Singles
4 Only was preceded by the pre-release single "Only" on August 27, 2021, and was supported by the main single "Red Lipstick" featuring Yoon Mi-rae, released with the album on September 9. 

The song "Savior" featuring B.I was scheduled to be released as the second pre-release single alongside "Only", but was delayed due to record production issues per a statement from AOMG. The music video for "Savior" was released on September 3, 2021, while the song was released on September 9, 2021, along with the rest of the album.

Promotions 
Lee Hi promoted "Red Lipstick" on M Countdown on September 9, Music Bank on September 10, Show! Music Core on September 11, and Inkigayo on September 12.

Critical reception
Kim Seong-yeop of IZM rated 4 Only 2.5 out of 5 stars. According to Kim, the album is pleasing to the ear as it encompasses a wide musical range but no song seems to pack a punch, including the lead single "Red Lipstick" and "Safety Zone". He added that the album serves as a "turning point" where Lee Hi breaks the image YG Entertainment created for her and expresses her true identity.

Upon the release of the lead single "Only", Kim Seong-uk of IZM rated it 3 out of 5 stars. He stated that it shows off Lee's "refined singing" while giving off a "warm aura". He concluded that with the song, Lee and songwriter Ahn Shin-ae proved that they work well together.

Angela Suacillo of NME rated the album 5 out of 5 stars. She commented that "Although five years may feel like too long a wait for new music, Lee Hi makes it all worth it by producing a cohesive record that not only stays true to her roots, but one that allows her to explore genres that strengthen her identity as one of K-pop’s strongest vocalists."

Accolades

Awards and nominations

Year-End Lists

Track listing

Charts

Sales

References

2021 albums
AOMG albums
Contemporary R&B albums by South Korean artists
Jazz albums by South Korean artists
Korean-language albums
Lee Hi albums
Synth-pop albums by South Korean artists